Robert Welch (born May 14, 1949) is a professional wrestler and manager better known by his ring names Robert Fuller and Col. Robert Parker. Robert and his brother Ron co-owned Continental Championship Wrestling for a time.

Professional wrestling career
Fuller started wrestling in 1970 in the Alabama and Tennessee regions. He often teamed with his cousin Jimmy Golden and they won many tag team titles. In the 1980s, he took his brother Ron's idea and made a stable called The Stud Stable. Among the members in the independent versions of this stable were Golden, Sid Vicious, Cactus Jack, Dutch Mantel, Brickhouse Brown, Gary Young, and Brian Lee. He spent some time in the American Wrestling Association with Golden in 1988, and they feuded with The Rock 'n' Roll Express (Ricky Morton and Robert Gibson). He also wrestled in the Texas area where he teamed with Jeff Jarrett.

In 1993, Fuller went to World Championship Wrestling as manager Col. Robert Parker, a takeoff of Col. Tom Parker of Elvis Presley fame. He managed Sid Vicious and teamed with manager Harley Race and his protege, Vader to form "The Masters of the Powerbomb". They feuded with Sting and Davey Boy Smith. In 1994, he managed "Stunning Steve" Austin before reforming his "Stud Stable" with Golden as "Bunkhouse Buck", Meng, Dick Slater, Terry Funk and Arn Anderson. They feuded heavily with Dusty and Dustin Rhodes. In 1995, Col. Parker courted Sherri Martel to the dismay of both the Stud Stable and Sherri's charges, Harlem Heat. Parker and Sherri went to get married and Sherri was attacked by Madusa, who was supposed to be Parker's wife. Parker and Sherri split and feuded and then made up again, with Parker leaving the Stud Stable to help Sherri manage Harlem Heat. While with Harlem Heat, Parker's official title was "promoter", while Sherri retained the "manager" designation. One trademark of Parker's managing would be his fanning himself during matches. In October 1996, Harlem Heat fired Parker after he cost them the WCW World Tag Team Championships. He quickly started to manage The Amazing French Canadians (Jacques Rougeau and Carl Ouellet), trading in his gray suit for a French Foreign Legion uniform. Harlem Heat and The Amazing French Canadians began feuding.

Fuller was released from WCW in 1997 and in March 1998, he resurfaced in the WWF as Tennessee Lee, a character similar to his Col. Parker character, and began managing Jeff Jarrett. His time in the WWF was short-lived; he would be released in August 1998 and went back to wrestling with Golden on the independent circuit in Alabama. On June 2, 2006 in Irondale, Alabama, Fuller managed Shannon Spruill against El Mexico for the NWA Wrestle Birmingham Junior Heavyweight Championship. With the help of Fuller (who referred to Spruill as his "Million Dollar Baby"), Spruill defeated El Mexico to win her third wrestling title. On September 14, 2006, Fuller was seen, once again as Col. Parker, being interviewed by Robert Roode on TNA Impact!. On February 8, 2018, Fuller made a return to professional wrestling as Col. Robert Parker, a manager for Major League Wrestling. He reactivated The Stud Stable with the Dirty Blondes as his first signees.

Personal life
Robert Fuller comes from a wrestling family: his father Buddy Fuller and his grandfather Roy Welch were wrestlers, as were his brother Ron Fuller and his cousin Jimmy Golden ("Bunkhouse Buck").

He has been married four times: Joyce Logan, who he has his oldest daughter Kimberly by; Sylvia Wilson (Miss Sylvia), who he has Katie and Charlotte by; Susan Lostraglio, who he had no children with; and his current wife Laverne Stewart. He has 7 grandchildren. Fuller currently resides in Seminole, Florida.

Championships and accomplishments
Championship Wrestling Alliance
CWA Heavyweight Championship (1 time)
CWA Television Championship (1 time)

Georgia Championship Wrestling
NWA Georgia Tag Team Championship (4 times) – with Bob Armstrong
NWA Macon Tag Team Championship (2 times) – with Jimmy Golden (1) and Don Muraco (1)

National Wrestling Alliance*
NWA Southeastern Heavyweight Championship (Northern Division) (4 times)

NWA Florida
PWF Tag Team Championship (1 time) – with Kendall Windham
NWA Wrestle Birmingham Alabama Tag Team Championship (1 time) – with Jimmy Golden
NWA National Tag Team titles (1 time) – with Jimmy Golden

NWA Mid-America / Continental Wrestling Association
AWA Southern Heavyweight Championship (2 times)
AWA Southern Tag Team Championship (2 times) – with Toru Tanaka (1) and Bill Dundee) (1)
CWA Tag Team Championship (3 times) – with Jimmy Golden (2) and Brian Lee (1)
NWA Southern Heavyweight Championship (Memphis version) (1 time)
NWA World Tag Team Championship (Mid-America Version) (1 time) – with Kevin Sullivan
NWA United States Tag Team Championship (Mid-America version)  (1 time) – with Ron Fuller

North American Wrestling Association / South Atlantic Pro Wrestling
NAWA/SAPW Heavyweight Championship (2 times)

Pro Wrestling Illustrated
PWI ranked him #102 of the top 500 singles wrestlers in the PWI 500 in 1991
PWI ranked him #332 of the top 500 singles wrestlers of the "PWI Years" in 2003
PWI ranked him #80 of the top 100 tag teams of the "PWI Years" with Jimmy Golden in 2003

Southeastern Championship Wrestling
NWA Southeastern Continental Heavyweight Championship (2 times)
NWA Southeastern Continental Tag Team Championship (2 times) - with Jimmy Golden
NWA Southeastern Heavyweight Championship (Northern Division) (2 times)
NWA Southeastern Tag Team Championship (15 times) – with Ron Fuller (2), Eddie Boulder (1), Jos LeDuc (3), Bob Armstrong (2), and Jimmy Golden (7)
NWA Southeastern Television Championship (2 times)

United States Wrestling Association
USWA World Tag Team Championship (6 times) – with Brian Lee (2), Jeff Jarrett (3), and Mike Mitchell (1)

USA Wrestling
USA Heavyweight Championship (1 time)
World Class Wrestling Association
WCWA World Tag Team Championship (2 times) – with Jimmy Golden (1) and Brian Lee (1)

*Records aren't clear as to which NWA affiliated promotion Fuller wrestled for when 4 of his 6 total reigns with it began. While the title was usually defended only in the Southeastern Championship Wrestling promotion, it was occasionally used in others such as Georgia Championship Wrestling.

Notes

References

External links 
 

1949 births
Living people
American male professional wrestlers
Professional wrestling managers and valets
People from Memphis, Tennessee
Professional wrestlers from Tennessee
Professional wrestling promoters
The Stud Stable members
People from Seminole, Florida
20th-century professional wrestlers
USWA World Tag Team Champions
NWA Florida Tag Team Champions
NWA Macon Tag Team Champions
NWA Georgia Tag Team Champions